Penard is a surname. Notable people with the surname include:

 Eugène Penard (1855–1954), Swiss biologist
 Thomas E. Penard (1878–1936), American engineer and ornithologist

See also
 Menard (surname)
 Renard (surname)